Anthela lineosa is a moth of the Anthelidae family.

References

Moths described in 1862
Anthelidae